Western Alliance may refer to:
NATO, an intergovernmental military alliance between 30 member states
Western Alliance Bancorporation, a bank holding company headquartered in Phoenix, Arizona